An Evening with Mike Nichols and Elaine May is a live comedy album by Nichols and May.

The album features selected pieces from the Broadway presentation of An Evening with Mike Nichols and Elaine May. The show opened October 8, 1960, in the Golden Theatre and was a smash with reviewers and audiences.

It peaked at 10 on the Billboard 200 and won the Grammy Award in 1962 for Best Comedy Performance Single or Album, Spoken or Musical.

Track listing
Telephone - 8:10
Adultery - 7:47
Disc Jockey - 9:02
Mother and Son - 6:30

References

1960 live albums
Nichols and May albums
Mercury Records albums
Cast recordings
Theatre soundtracks
Grammy Award for Best Comedy Album
1960s comedy albums
1960s spoken word albums